Aglossa asiatica is a species of snout moth in the genus Aglossa. It was described by Nikolay Grigoryevich Erschoff in 1872. It is found in Uzbekistan, Syria, Iran, Pakistan and on Crete and Cyprus.

Taxonomy
It is sometimes listed as a subspecies of Aglossa pinguinalis.

References

Pyralini
Moths of Europe
Moths of Asia
Moths described in 1872